ABC-TV may refer to:
American Broadcasting Company, a radio and television network in the United States
ABC Television (Australian TV network)
ABC Canberra (TV station), the ABC television station in Canberra
 ABC TV (Australian TV channel), the Australian television channel, formerly known as ABC1
 ABC TV Plus, the Australian digital television channel
ABC Australia (Southeast Asian TV channel), the former Australia Network / Australia Plus
 ABC Weekend TV, a former ITV company in the United Kingdom
 Asahi Broadcasting Corporation, a radio and television broadcaster in Osaka, Japan
 Associated Broadcasting Company
 a former name of TV5 Network, a radio and television network in the Philippines
 a former name of Associated Television (ATV), a former ITV company in the United Kingdom
 ABC Television (Nepal), a television channel in Nepal
 ABC-TV (Paraguayan TV channel), a television channel in Paraguay

See also
 ABC Television (disambiguation)